Arruns Tarquinius may refer to:

 Arruns Tarquinius (son of Tarquin the Proud)
 Arruns Tarquinius (son of Demaratus)
 Arruns Tarquinius (Egerius)
 Arruns Tarquinius (brother of Tarquin the Proud)